Orthaea is a genus of flowering plants belonging to the family Ericaceae.

Its native range is southwestern Mexico to northern and western South America, Trinidad.

Species
Species:

Orthaea abbreviata 
Orthaea apophysata 
Orthaea boliviensis 
Orthaea brachysiphon 
Orthaea breviflora 
Orthaea bullata 
Orthaea carnosiflora 
Orthaea caudata 
Orthaea cavendishioides 
Orthaea constans 
Orthaea cordata 
Orthaea coriacea 
Orthaea crinita 
Orthaea ecuadorensis 
Orthaea ferreyrae 
Orthaea fimbriata 
Orthaea glandulifera 
Orthaea hispida 
Orthaea ignea 
Orthaea madidiensis 
Orthaea medusula 
Orthaea merumensis 
Orthaea minor 
Orthaea oedipus 
Orthaea oriens 
Orthaea panamensis 
Orthaea paniculata 
Orthaea paruensis 
Orthaea peregrina 
Orthaea pinnatinervia 
Orthaea rusbyi 
Orthaea secundiflora 
Orthaea stipitata 
Orthaea thibaudioides 
Orthaea venamensis 
Orthaea weberbaueri 
Orthaea wurdackii

References

Ericaceae
Ericaceae genera